The 2003 USL Premier Development League season was the 9th PDL season. The season began in April 2003 and ended in August 2003.

Cape Cod Crusaders finished the season as national champions for the second time, beating Chicago Fire Reserves 2-0 in the PDL Championship game. New Orleans Shell Shockers finished with the best regular season record in the league, winning 16 out of their 18 games, suffering just 2 losses, and finishing with a +35 goal difference. 

Cape Cod Crusaders striker Joseph Ngwenya and Vermont Voltage forward Bo Vuckovic were the league's top scorers, each knocking in 17 goals. Des Moines Menace midfielders Tomas Boltnar and Joseph Kabwe and Nashville Metros Ben Buerger led the league with 10 assists each, while Indiana Invaders keeper Christopher Sawyer enjoyed the best goalkeeping statistics, with a goals-against average of 0.287 per game, and Richmond Kickers Future keeper kept 7 clean sheets and had a GAA average of 0.568 in his 12 games.

Changes from 2002

New franchises 
Thirteen teams joined the league this year, including twelve brand new franchises:

Folding 
Ten teams left the league prior to the beginning of the season:
Central Coast Roadrunners - San Luis Obispo, California
Chicago Eagles Select - Chicago, Illinois
Chico Rooks - Chico, California (left to join the newly formed National Premier Soccer League)
Dayton Gemini - Dayton, Ohio
Denver Cougars - Commerce City, Colorado
Los Angeles Heroes - Los Angeles, California
Santa Barbara Sharks - Santa Barbara, California (folded during the 2002 season)
Seattle Sounders Select - Seattle, Washington (folded during the 2002 season)
Tampa Bay Hawks - Tampa, Florida
West Michigan Edge - Grand Rapids, Michigan (spending season on hiatus)

Standings

Central Conference

Great Lakes Division

Heartland Division

Eastern Conference

Mid Atlantic Division

Northeast Division

Southern Conference

Mid South Division

Southeast Division

Western Conference

Northwest Division

Southwest Division

Playoffs

References

2003
4
3